NADPH-diaphorase may refer to:

 NADPH dehydrogenase
 Nitric oxide synthase